Leonardo Marchi Rivero (born 17 September 1996) is an Argentine professional footballer who plays as a left-back for Arsenal de Sarandí.

Career
Marchi joined the system of Defensa y Justicia from Gimnasia y Esgrima in 2015. In July 2018, Marchi left on loan to Primera B Nacional side Arsenal de Sarandí for twelve months. He failed to make an appearance as they won promotion to the Primera División; though was on the bench six total times. His loan expired on 30 June 2019, though he remained for one further season but only featured for their reserves. In August 2020, Marchi signed a new contract with Arsenal; lasting until December 2021. His senior bow soon came, aged twenty-four, against Racing Club on 14 November 2020.

Personal life
Marchi is the son of Sergio Marchi, who was the secretary general of the Futbolistas Argentinos Agremiados; Argentina's players union.

Career statistics
.

Notes

References

External links

1996 births
Living people
Footballers from La Plata
Argentine footballers
Association football defenders
Defensa y Justicia footballers
Arsenal de Sarandí footballers
Club Atlético Mitre footballers
Argentine people of Italian descent